In the Bone: The Best Science Fiction of Gordon R. Dickson is a collection of science fiction stories by Gordon R. Dickson.  It was first published by Ace Books in 1987 and expands Dickson's earlier collection, Gordon R. Dickson's SF Best.  Most of the stories originally appeared in the magazines Analog Science Fiction and Fact, Fantasy and Science Fiction, Satellite and If.

Contents

 "Twig"
 "God Bless Them"
 "Hilifter"
 "Brother Charlie"
 "Act of Creation"
 "Idiot Solvant"
 "Call Him Lord"
 "Tiger Green"
 "Of the People"
 "Dolphin’s Way"
 "In the Bone"

References

1987 short story collections
Short story collections by Gordon R. Dickson
Ace Books books